The 2019 Scandinavian FIM Speedway Grand Prix was the sixth race of the 2019 Speedway Grand Prix season. It took place on August 17 at the G&B Arena in Målilla, Sweden.

Riders 
Second reserve Max Fricke replaced Greg Hancock, while third reserve Mikkel Michelsen replaced Antonio Lindbäck. The Speedway Grand Prix Commission nominated Jacob Thorssell as the wild card, and Kim Nilsson and Viktor Palovaara both as Track Reserves.

Results 
The Grand Prix was won by Fredrik Lindgren, who beat Leon Madsen, Maciej Janowski and Artem Laguta in the final. It was the fourth Grand Prix win of Lindgren's career.

Madsen's second-place finish saw him take control of the overall standings on 75 points, six points clear of Bartosz Zmarzlik in second (see intermediate classification table below).

Heat details

Intermediate classification

References 

2019
Grand Prix of Scandinavia
Scandinavia
2019 in Swedish motorsport
August 2019 sports events in Europe